In military architecture, a covertway or covered way is a path on top of the counterscarp of a fortification. It is protected by an embankment which is made up by the crest of the glacis. It is able to give the fort's garrison a position beyond the ditch, as well as a continuous line of communication around the outworks.

An enlarged area within a covertway designed to allow troops to assemble on it is known as a place-of-arms.

References

Fortification (architectural elements)